The term EM2 may refer to :

Science and technology
 Energy Multiplier Module, a nuclear fission reactor under development by General Atomics
 Exploration Mission-2, a previous name of Artemis 2, a planned mission for NASA's Orion spacecraft
 Expression Media 2, Microsoft digital asset management software, a precursor of Phase One Media Pro
 Haplogroup E-M2, an African haplogroup in human DNA
 EM2, a designation for a vacuum tube, of Magic Eye type

Transport
 British Rail Class 77, or Class EM2, an electric locomotive used on the Woodhead electrified railway line
 Embraer EMB 120 Brasilia, abbreviated EM2, a commercial aircraft manufactured in Brazil
 Elias EM-2, a 1920s US military biplane
 Freightliner eM2, an all-electric medium-duty cube truck
 EM2, chassis code for a 2001–2005 Honda Civic coupe
 EM-2, a model of farm tractor by the Greek company Malkotsis

Other
 EM-2 rifle, an experimental British assault rifle
 Epic Mickey 2: The Power of Two, a video game
 EM2, or Electrician's Mate 2nd Class, an enlisted rate in the US Navy and US Coast Guard
 EM2, a category for streaming pupils formerly used in education in Singapore